Ceto, the Foolish Millionaire (Turkish: Çeto salak milyoner) is a 1953 Turkish comedy film directed by Orhan Erçin.

Cast
   Orhan Erçin  
 Hayri Esen  
 Rana Sivga 
 Ayten Çankaya  
 Sadri Karan  
 Gazanfer Özcan  
 Mürüvet Sim

References

Bibliography
 Burçak Evren. Türk sinema sanatçıları ansiklopedisi. Film-San Vakfı Yayınları, 1983.

External links
 

1953 films
1953 comedy films
1950s Turkish-language films
Turkish comedy films
Turkish black-and-white films